Felizes para Sempre? (English: Happily Ever After?) is a Brazilian television miniseries directed by Fernando Meirelles and written by Euclydes Marinho. It aired from 26 January to 6 February 2015 on Rede Globo.

It is a remake of Quem Ama não Mata by Euclydes Marinho, and is written by himself, Angela Carneiro, Denise Bandeira and Márcia Prates, with collaborations by Bia Fonseca Corrêa do Lago. Luciano Moura, Rodrigo Meirelles, Paulo Morelli and Fernando Meirelles directed it.

Plot 
The series is set in Brasília and follows five couples from the same family. Dionisio (Perfeito Fortuna) and Norma Drummond (Selma Egrei) met in 1968 amidst an anti-Brazilian military dictatorship demonstration. He was a military police officer and she was a sociology student. Despite both being in opposite political sides, they fell in love and had three children: Claudio (Enrique Diaz), Hugo (João Miguel) and Joel (João Baldasserini). Dionisio is suffering from erectile dysfunction and finds himself giving in to a past affair, Olga (Cássia Kis Magro), who is visiting the city. Meanwhile, Norma is constantly being stalked by the much younger Guilherme (Antonio Sabóia), who also teaches at her university.

Cláudio is a millionaire corrupt businessman and playboy, owner of a large engineering company, and is married to Marília (Maria Fernanda Cândido), an art restorator. They both had a son, João Cláudio, who drowned in their swimming pool at the age of five, leaving them traumatized. Marília regrets it's been long since the last time she felt any pleasure with Cláudio, and he usually cheats her with several different women, usually prostitutes. One of these prostitutes is the bisexual Denise (Paolla Oliveira), who also goes by her work name Danny Bond, in reference to James Bond. She is married to Daniela (Martha Nowill), who is initially unaware of her job as a prostitute.

Hugo is a shooting sport enthusiast and engineer who suffers from alcoholism. He works at Cláudio's company, though he doesn't get along with his brother. He is married to Tânia (Adriana Esteves), a famous plastic surgeon. Contrary to Cláudio's and Marília's situation, they have too much sex and Tânia doesn't always feel like doing it. Eventually, Tânia gives in to a past passion, David (Bruno Giordano), who offers her a position as his business partner in his prestigious clinic. Hugo and Tânia have a 16-year-old son, Hugo Jr., who takes part of political demonstrations and amidst one of them, he meets Mayra (Sílvia Lourenço), an older black bloc woman who starts dating him.

Joel is the adoptive son and also works at Cláudio's office. He starts his part in the series by announcing his amicable divorce with his wife, the personal trainer Suzana (Carol Abras), but their relationship grows more difficult every day, with Joel becoming obsessed and aggressive to her and she trying to start a new life with a local farmer called Buza (Rodrigo dos Santos).

Cast 
 Maria Fernanda Cândido as Marília Drummond
 Enrique Díaz as Cláudio Drummond
 Paolla Oliveira as Denise / Simone / Danny Bond
 João Miguel as Hugo Drummond
 Adriana Esteves as Tânia Drummond
 João Baldasserini as Joel Drummond
 Carol Abras as Susana Drummond
 Selma Egrei as Norma Drummond
 Perfeito Fortuna as Dionísio Drummond
 Cássia Kis Magro as Olga
 Rodrigo dos Santos as Buza
 Martha Nowill as Daniela
 Matheus Fagundes as Hugo Drummond Jr., a.k.a. Júnior 
 Antônio Saboia as Guilherme
 Bruno Giordano as David Rondinelli
 Christiana Ubach as Ludmila 
 Bel Kowarick as Dr. Fernanda
 Mariana Loureiro as Telma
 Gero Camilo as Carlos Pavão
 Ghilherme Lobo as Dionísio (young)
 Julia Bernat as Olga (young) 
 Sílvia Lourenço as Mayra
 Carlos Meceni as Dr. Bastos
 Luciléia Lopes P Felix as Background actress
 Cláudia Alencar as Alice Rondinelli
 Fafá Rennó as Virna
 Teca Pereira as Soraia
 Rodrigo Matheus as Businessman

Episodes

Production 
Marinho originally wanted to set the story in Niterói, but Meirelles convinced him to change it to Brazilian capital Brasília. There, places such as the Jardim Botânico de Brasília, the City Park Dona Sarah Kubitschek, University of Brasília, Praça dos Cristais, Itamaraty Palace, Palácio da Alvorada, Justice Palace and the Chapada dos Veadeiros National Park. Banker Edemar Cid Ferreira's house was used as Tânia's clinic. The characters' names are a tribute to the actors who worked at the original series.

Reception 
The story full of sex scenes with actress Paolla Oliveira made a splash on the internet. On Twitter, seven terms related to ‘Happily Ever After?’ entered the Trending Topics in Brazil, among them #felizesparasempre (original title), #ripdannybond (in reference to the actress's character) and #obrigadoadrianaesteves (reference to actress Adriana Esteves, who played Carminha in Brazil Avenue). The miniseries aired on Globo's 11:00 pm time slot in Brazil, obtaining a 39% share and more than 17 million viewers.

References

External links

 

2015 Brazilian television series debuts
2015 Brazilian television series endings
Brazilian drama television series
Portuguese-language television shows
Rede Globo original programming
Television series about dysfunctional families
Television series about family history
Television shows set in Brasília
Bisexuality-related television series
Lesbian-related television shows
Brazilian LGBT-related television shows